Thakur Dan Singh Bisht (1906 – 10 September 1964) was a philanthropist from Kumaon, Uttarakhand, India.

At its height, his massive timber depots with attendant offices and bungalows for managers extended across the Himalayas from Lahore to Wazirabad in what later became Pakistan, Jammu  to Pathankot, Kartanya Ghat and Kaurilya Ghat and C.B.Ganj Bareilly, Bihar and Tanakpur, Kathgodam and Pithoragarh and Haldwani  to Goalpara and Garo Hills as well as Bardiya district and Kathmandu in Nepal. Vast properties purchased by his father and him at each location led to his immersion in local lore as a folk hero, who rode on a horse, with hands always full to give. At its height his father's company, D. S. Bist and Sons, consisted of Dev Singh Bist, Dan Singh Bist and his younger brother, Mohan Singh Bist. DS Bist and Sons employed over 5000 people and had tens of millions of rupees in business. but was bidding for contracts in the Andamans and even Brazil when Dan Singh Bisht met his death after completing his last purchase of Beldanga Sugar Mill in Murshidabad. He collapsed in his suite at the Grand Hotel (Kolkata)  due to health and stress caused by the anti-business pandora's box the newly independent India opened. He had recently sold the plant he had set up at a discount, sensing no solution, as the Government had refused his machinery to leave Calcutta Port despite having first authorized Dan Singh Bist to take a hefty loan to procure the same. The Bisht Industrial Corporation Ltd. which was formed by D. S. Bisht and sons of Nainital in whose favour an industrial licence was granted in 1956 to set up a sugar factory of two thousand tonnes capacity a day at Kichha  to meet the 'crying need' of the cultivators, of sugar-cane in district Nainital. But after Dan Singh Bisht sold his shares in 1963, and subsequently died the next year, it did not run even for a day and was ultimately taken over by Government, by an ordinance issued on 12 September 1970 which was replaced by Bisht Industrial Corporation Limited (Acquisition of Undertaking) Act, No. 7 of 1971.

Bisht's empire began to collapse even as he lay in hospital in a coma, dying ultimately on 10 September 1964.
He had no son, and his was a patriarchal society. His daughters were children, or just married. The fate of Beldanga sugar mill is unknown, as Dan Singh Bisht fell into a coma the day after procurement and his daughters were mostly minors. The mill at Kichha is now a governmental-run mill. His prime real estate in Nainital, several architecturally significant British cottages with lake views, of several acres each such as Primrose, Cambridge Hall, and Grasmere are alienated, and as well as several bungalows and timber depots scattered across his areas of operation.

The Tea gardens of Chaukori and Berinag collapsed almost immediately or began steady descent into anarchy, in the absence of a central intelligence, and combined with socialistic policies and inaction of the Government, Berinag became a town with a population of 25,000 inhabitants and a living breathing municipality where the tea estate used to be, as documented by the Sub-divisional Magistrate of Tehsil at Berinag, in October, 2004 in a report to the Chief Secretary and District Magistrate. and Chaukori remained in a state of neglect. The dairy farm at Chaukori shut down. The  fruit producing and eucalyptus tree export power house 'Dhara Farms' near Moradabad was taken by the Government under new anti-landlord rules. The history of these farms, among the biggest in India, at the time, is interesting. One Raja Gajendra Shah of Moradabad, incurred massive debts to the state, and died in 1943. Unpaid debts allowed the State to acquire these massive lands and these were then bought by Bisht for 235,000 rupees on 30 October 1945.

Its brand was so strong that even after Dan Singh died, from 1964 till the late 1980s, Berinag tea continued to be actively sought by people who loved and remembered its kippery taste, rich red colour and taste, and 'its unique light taste and colour'. It con to run because his brother Mohan Singh Bist ran it. It collapsed only after his death in 1977.

Early life and business activities
Dan Singh Bisht was born in Pithoragarh district, Wadda, in 1906. His father had opened a small shop selling ghee in an insignificant town bordering Nepal. The river Kali is the boundary and the town is called Jhulaghat, literally rope bridge area. Dan Singh's father had immigrated from Western Nepal Baitadi district and Dan Singh retained his Nepalese citizenship until Indian Independence. Aged 12, he left his studies to work as an apprentice with a British timber contractor in Burma, Maymyo then part of British India. It was here he learned the economics of the timber trade, and more importantly how to dress and talk like a 'sahib'. These skills would be leveraged to create a monopoly.

When Bisht returned from Burma, his father had just taken the biggest gamble of his life. On 19 September 1919, his father Deb Singh Bisht, a small-time shopkeeper from Jhulaghat, took out a loan to buy  of Chaukori estate from a British company.
It was this daring that Dan Singh later sought to immortalise in the resolute bronze statue of Deb Singh Bisht that stares out at young students in a bid to inspire them. Dan Singh not only managed to purchase the Berinag estate adjacent, from Captain James Corbett but found the secret ingredient that had enabled the Chinese to outcompete Indian teas in next door Lhasa. His manager located a herb that the Chinese used to add which contributed to its rich colour and flavour. The secret ingredient greatly improve Bisht's position. On 20 May 1924, at the age of 18 years, he purchased a brewery from the British Indian Corporation Limited and on those  began to build a home and office for him and his father at Bisht Estate. Berinag tea became the number one brand in the Chinese, London and Indian markets. Bisht managed to get financial support from the Tea Board Association, Calcutta, something both Corbett and the previous owner, Robert Bellairs' father from whom Corbett had bought Berinag. had failed to do.

Bisht worked in the hardest of terrain, upstream rivers, and used waterways and rope bridges to transport the timber. From Kisnai to Mendipathar he built a short-cut which is locally called the 'Bisht Road' to ease transportation. It is a dirt track now.
it was here, in the Garo Hills, that he encountered a matriarchal society where the women inherit the property which is distinctly at odds with his patriarchal 'Thakur' way of being. This gave him that perhaps at least one or more of his seven daughters would contain the seed that could salvage the empire. He knew the question of succession was his Achilles' heel. This set him to work on the purchase of Smuggler's Rock Estate, to donate the land and building for the first girl's hostel at DSB college.

Philanthropy
In 1947, Bisht founded Sri Sarswati Deb Singh Higher Secondary School, Pithoragarh. It was named after his parents and was the first higher secondary school in the area, providing education up to A-level. He provided the land, buildings, furniture and seed money. In 1949, Bisht created the Srimati Saraswati Bisht Scholarship Endowment trust (SSBSE) to provide scholarships to children of Pithoragarh residents who had been killed in action in World War I and to deserving students of the secondary school.

Bisht bought the Wellesley Girls' School in Nainital, added more buildings to it and converted it into DBS College in 1951. THe first post-A level educational institute in the area, it is now the DSB Campus College of Kumaon University, which was founded in 1973 by the incorporation of Dev Singh Bisht (DSB) Government College (commonly called "the Degree College"). This was clearly documented in the recollections J.M. Clay's book on Nainital who was the Deputy Commissioner of Nainital in 1927 as well as in 'Nainital, the land of trumpet and song' by G. Shah in 1999, as well as by Professor Ajay Singh Rawat.

Bisht chose the mathematician Dr. A.N. Singh as its first principal and set up a scholarship for needy students called 'Thakur Dan Singh Bisht Scholarship' and it is still utilized today.

Noted environmentalist and senior Professor of Kumaun University Professor Ajay Singh Rawat has called Dan Singh Bisht "The Pioneer of Higher Education in Uttrakhand" in his book Nainital Beckons and also in the journal Udaan for Uttrakhand Open University where he was the Chief editor. He says it seems that now "Even Kumaon University which could not have come into existence without the DSB Campus does not remember him. It is our duty to pay homage to him and to his contribution to society and for his visionary and philanthropic spirit so that posterity also remembers him". Dan Singh Bisht, a pioneer of the entrepreneur philanthropist in modern India.

During 1920–25, Bisht lobbied Maurice Garnier Hallett, who was the Governor of the United Provinces, for an all-weather road from rail head Tanakpur to Pithoragarh. Almost a 100 years later, it remains Pithoragarh's only lifeline to the train station. Once his proposal passed, the road increased trade, commerce, tourism, and strategic resources a gift that continues till this day. Hallett summoned Bisht in connection with his clandestine funding of the freedom movement. Dan Singh Bisht managed to talk himself out of this harrowing moment for his empire. This story is not documented anywhere, but it was told in 1963 to his 26-year-old son in law, Surendra Singh who would later go on to become the Cabinet Secretary of India.

Other Philanthropy in his childhood haunts

The first three-story Dharamshala or rest house for pilgrims those who follow 'Dharam'  was built by him in memory of his grandfather Rai Singh Bisht. Additional medical help was given to many in Berinag with financial help to hospitals and patients. This is documented in a registered land records patwari office of Berinag.  of prime land was donated in Berinag in his brother's name for a college, as well as a school a playground a hospital, and for various governmental offices, including the ethereal Forest Rest house in Berinag. Drinking water in the village of his forefathers in Kuintarh, various dispensaries in Berinag, and the tales of the innumerable people whose education he paid for either because of need, or merit, is part of Kumaoni folklore. The whole town of Berinag is unique for in that every single public amenity from schools, to hospitals, playgrounds, parks, charitable centres, dispensaries, are all donations of D S Bisht and Sons.

Personal life
Bisht was a benefactor member of the Nainital Boat House Club. He had three wives, as was permitted before the Hindu Marriage Act, and seven daughters who were all young when he died on 10 September 1964. Their youthfulness enabled managers and advisors to gain control, and the empire of sugar mills, tea gardens, and timber, collapsed.

References

Businesspeople from Uttarakhand
Kumaoni people
1906 births
1964 deaths
People from Pithoragarh district
20th-century Indian philanthropists